National Highway 302 (NH 302) starts from Lunglei and ends at Theriat, both places in the state of Mizoram.

See also
 List of National Highways in India (by Highway Number)
 List of National Highways in India
 National Highways Development Project

References

External links
 About NH 302
 NH 302 on OpenStreetMap

302
National highways in India